Kajgana.com is an independent Macedonian language web portal launched in January 2005. With over 1,000,000 unique visitors per month, it is currently the most visited Macedonian web portal.

Kajgana.com also hosts the most popular Macedonian internet forum, an online advertiser, an internet radio, and game servers, and is the home of many Macedonian internet memes.

Management
Darko Lazarevski (Co-founder and Editor-in-chief)
Marjan Lazarevski (Co-founder and Co-editor)
Dejan Petkovski (Co-founder and CMO)
Darko Stoilevski (Co-founder and CTO)
Vladislav Bidikov (web master)

External links
Kajgana.com
Kajgana.com forum
Kajgana.com advertiser
Kajgana.com game servers
Kajgana.com radio

Web portals
Internet properties established in 2005